Takao Suzuki was the champion in 2009.
Matteo Viola won the title by defeating Mirza Bašić 7–6(7–3), 6–3 in the final.

Seeds

Draw

Finals

Top half

Bottom half

References
 Main Draw
 Qualifying Draw

Singles